The Full Treatment (also known as The Treatment and Stop Me Before I Kill!) is a 1960 black-and-white, British thriller film directed by Val Guest and starring Claude Dauphin, Diane Cilento and Ronald Lewis. It was based on the 1959 novel The Full Treatment by Ronald Scott Thorn.

Plot
English racing driver Alan Colby and his wife Denise were involved in a bad accident a year ago. Although they are both physically well, Alan struggles with mood swings and is increasingly violent. The couple go to the Cote D'Azur on vacation where they meet Dr. Prade, a psychiatrist who also hails from London. Prade and Denise talk about her troubled marriage, which angers Alan. After a fight, the couple reconcile and return to London.

Once back home, Alan attempts to strangle Denise and is horrified by his dark impulses. She begs him to seek help from Prade, and he reluctantly agrees. In an early session, Prade presses Alan to reveal how he would kill Denise. Alan confesses all the details of his fantasy, which includes strangling Denise in bed, dismembering her body, and dropping the pieces down a disposal chute in their apartment building.

After many sessions, Prade concludes that Alan thought, in the moment of the car crash, he had killed Denise and has been reliving those feelings ever since. Alan is ecstatic when Prade declares him cured.

Alan awakes the next morning and is surprised to find Prade in his apartment. He returns a key that Denise gave him when Alan was at his most dangerous. The men realize that Denise is gone. Prade pieces together clues, all of which resemble Alan's murderous fantasy, and they fear that he killed Denise while in a psychotic fugue state. Prade attempts to take Alan to a clinic but gets in a car accident on the way there. In the confusion, Alan escapes back to southern France. While lying low, he spots Denise and Prade on a yacht.

Prade has deceived Denise into taking a vacation while believing that Alan is under intense psychiatric care. Alan appears with a gun at Prade's house, believing that Prade and Denise conspired against him. Prade tells Alan that he has been in a clinic for 10 days, causing Alan to question his sanity once again. Denise, however, finds an estimate for repairs to Prade's car and realizes that he slaughtered his own cat to stage the murder scene to deceive Alan. When she confronts Prade, he reveals his love for Denise and attempts to escape on an old gondola lift. The cable snaps. and Prade is killed.

Alan and Denise are reunited, but solemn after their ordeal.

Cast
 Claude Dauphin as David Prade 
 Diane Cilento as Denise Colby 
 Ronald Lewis as Alan Colby 
 Françoise Rosay as Madame Prade 
 Bernard Braden as Harry Stonehouse 
 Katya Douglas as Connie 
 Barbara Chilcott as Baroness de la Vailion 
 Ann Tirard as Nicole 
 Edwin Styles as Doctor Roberts 
 George Merritt as Mr. Manfield

Critical reception
 The New York Times wrote "the British have concocted a snug, tautly-strung little thriller called "Stop Me Before I Kill!"...Mr. Guest's package is a small one, but trim and adroitly tied. The contents are worth waiting for."
 The Radio Times wrote "at times the writer/director, Val Guest, seems to think he's making a Hitchcock picture but he needs more than glamorous locations for that. He also needs Cary Grant and Ingrid Bergman."
 TV Guide noted "suspenseful direction and a beautiful Riviera location."

References

External links

1960 films
1960s thriller films
British thriller films
1960s English-language films
Films directed by Val Guest
Films based on British novels
Films about psychiatry
Films set on the French Riviera
Films shot at Associated British Studios
Hammer Film Productions films
Films about marriage
Uxoricide in fiction
1960s British films